Webster State Park is a state park of Kansas, United States.  It is located west of the city of Stockton in Rooks County.  The park offers camping as well as boating on Webster Reservoir.

See also
 List of Kansas state parks
 List of lakes, reservoirs, and dams in Kansas
 List of rivers of Kansas

References

External links
 Webster State Park

State parks of Kansas
Protected areas established in 1965
Protected areas of Rooks County, Kansas
1965 establishments in Kansas